Iceland participated in the Eurovision Song Contest 2001 with the song "Angel" written by Einar Bárðarson and Magnús Þór Sigmundsson. The song was performed by the duo Two Tricky. The Icelandic entry for the 2001 contest in Copenhagen, Denmark was selected through the national final Söngvakeppni Sjónvarpsins 2001, organised by the Icelandic broadcaster Ríkisútvarpið (RÚV). Eight songs competed in the selection which was held on 17 February 2001. "Birta" performed by Kristján Gíslason and Gunnar Ólason emerged as the winner exclusively through public televoting. The song was later translated from Icelandic to English for the Eurovision Song Contest and was titled "Angel", while the duo was renamed as Two Tricky.

Iceland competed in the Eurovision Song Contest which took place on 12 May 2001. Performing as the opening entry for the show in position 2, Iceland placed twenty-second (joint last) out of the 23 participating countries, scoring 3 points.

Background 

Prior to the 2001 Contest, Iceland had participated in the Eurovision Song Contest fourteen times since its first entry in 1986. Iceland's best placing in the contest to this point was second, which it achieved in 1999 with the song "All Out of Luck" performed by Selma. In 2000, Iceland placed twelfth with the song "Tell Me!" performed by August and Telma. The Icelandic national broadcaster, Ríkisútvarpið (RÚV), broadcasts the event within Iceland and organises the selection process for the nation's entry. Between 1995 and 1999, Iceland opted to internally select their entry for the Eurovision Song Contest. In 2000, a national final was used to select the Icelandic entry, a method that continued for their 2001 participation.

Before Eurovision

Söngvakeppni Sjónvarpsins 2001 
Söngvakeppni Sjónvarpsins 2001 took place on 17 February 2001 at the RÚV studios in Reykjavík during the television programme Milli himins og jarðar, hosted by Steinunn Ólína Þorsteinsdóttir, where eight entries competed. The winner, "Birta" performed Kristján Gíslason and Gunnar Ólason, was determined solely by televoting. Despite the initial announcement that the song would remain in Icelandic at the Eurovision Song Contest due to a new rule specifying that the winning entry was required to be performed in Icelandic at the contest, "Birta" was ultimately performed in English as "Angel" following protests from the Association of Composers (FTT), as well as from Kristján and Gunnar themselves.

At Eurovision 
According to Eurovision rules, all nations with the exceptions of the seven countries with the lowest average result in the past five contests competed in the final on 12 May 2001. On 21 November 2000, a special allocation draw was held which determined the running order and Iceland was set to perform in position 2, following the entry from the Netherlands and before the entry from Bosnia and Herzegovina. Iceland finished in twenty-second (joint last) place with 3 points.

The show was broadcast in Iceland on RÚV with commentary by Gísli Marteinn Baldursson. The Icelandic spokesperson, who announced the Icelandic votes during the show, was Eva María Jónsdóttir.

Voting 
Below is a breakdown of points awarded to Iceland and awarded by Iceland in the contest. The nation awarded its 12 points to Denmark in the contest.

References 

2001
Countries in the Eurovision Song Contest 2001
Eurovision